Francesca D'Oriano (born 26 September 1975) is an Italian diver. She competed in two events at the 1996 Summer Olympics.

References

1975 births
Living people
Italian female divers
Olympic divers of Italy
Divers at the 1996 Summer Olympics
Sportspeople from Florence